Erik James Coleman (born May 6, 1982) is a former American football safety in the National Football League (NFL). He was drafted by the New York Jets in the fifth round of the 2004 NFL Draft and also played for the Atlanta Falcons and Detroit Lions. He played college football at Washington State.

College career
Coleman played college football at Washington State. He majored in communications.

Professional career

New York Jets
Coleman was selected by the New York Jets in the fifth round (143rd overall) of the 2004 NFL Draft. He unexpectedly became one of the most important Jet defenders, cementing his starting role with interceptions in each of his first two NFL games. He finished the season as the NFL's highest grossing member of its performance-pay program, the league's plan for rewarding low-salary players who outperform their contracts. In week six of the 2005 season against the Buffalo Bills he made a career high 14 tackles. Before the 2006 season Coleman underwent an appendectomy, slowing his production that season. During his tenure with the New York Jets he started in 45 of 48 regular season games.

Atlanta Falcons

On March 1, 2008, Coleman was signed by the Atlanta Falcons. In the 2008 season, Erik Coleman had 95 total tackles, 6 passes deflected, and three interceptions. Those three interceptions were the most on the Atlanta Falcons team.

On February 9, 2011, Coleman was released from the Falcons.

Detroit Lions
On February 18, 2011, Coleman signed a one-year contract with the Detroit Lions. He was released on December 4, 2012.

Post-NFL career

SNY
Following his retirement in 2013 from the NFL, Coleman joined the SNY team. Coleman uses his own on-field experience as an on-air sports analyst, reporting post-game recaps for SNY’s "Jets Post Game Live!", "Jets Extra Point", "Jets Nation" and SNY's Jets Draft show. Frequently also appearing as a sports commentator on numerous sports shows and network programs such as Hannity on Fox, Closing Bell with Liz Claman on Fox Business, ABC, PIX 11, CBS, ESPN Radio and WFAN, to name a few.

Radio
In addition to his on-camera career, Coleman has hit the airwaves as a radio host. Coleman began his radio resume as an on-air analyst with Stony Brook University’s football radio broadcast team in 2015. Most recently, Coleman has joined Sirius XM as a host on Channel 88’s for NFL rewind discussing the plays of the week and engaging with fans.

Philanthropy
As a humanitarian, Coleman is a mentor for My Brother’s Keeper Mentorship Program, and supports a number of causes including, pediatric cancer, traumatic brain injury, and sickle cell anemia. Adding to his list of long charity causes, Coleman is the celebrity ambassador for The THRIVE Network, an organization that helps those with disabilities in need.

Entrepreneurship
With his years on the football field, being healthy has become a big factor in his daily life, and his goal is to enhance the health of those around him. Coleman is the practice manager for Core Medical NY, a company dedicated to revolutionizing the anti-aging process.

References

1982 births
Living people
Players of American football from Sacramento, California
African-American players of American football
American football safeties
Washington State Cougars football players
New York Jets players
Atlanta Falcons players
Detroit Lions players
21st-century African-American sportspeople
20th-century African-American people